Milizac-Guipronvel is a commune in the department of Finistère, western France. The municipality was established on 1 January 2017 by merger of the former communes of Guipronvel (the seat) and Milizac.

Population

See also 
Communes of the Finistère department

References 

Communes of Finistère

Communes nouvelles of Finistère
Populated places established in 2017
2017 establishments in France